William Gibson (born 1 August 1981) is a Scottish footballer who plays as a defender or a midfielder for Kilbirnie Ladeside in the Scottish Junior Football Association, West Region. He has previously played in the Scottish Premier League for Partick Thistle.

Club career

He started his career with Rangers, before moving to fellow Glasgow club Partick Thistle on loan for the first half of 2004. He was released by Rangers that summer, and joined Thistle on a permanent transfer in July 2004. This spell lasted 3 years, before he moved to Ireland to play for St Patrick's Athletic in June 2007.

Gibson moved back to Scotland in January 2008, and signed for Partick Thistle's rivals, Clyde. He was signed by John Brown, who coached him during his spell with Rangers. He made his debut in a 3–1 defeat by Stirling Albion on 2 February 2008. Gibson's contract was terminated in June 2009, following Clyde's relegation and financial troubles.

Gibson went on to sign for First Division newcomers Ayr United, before joining Alloa Athletic for the 2010–11 season. He then spent almost a year out of football before joining Junior side Linlithgow Rose in the summer of 2012. Gibson moved on to Kilbirnie Ladeside in August 2014.

See also
Clyde F.C. season 2007-08 | 2008–09

References

External links
 (Rangers to Alloa)
 (Clyde and Ayr)

Living people
Footballers from Bellshill
Scottish footballers
Rangers F.C. players
Partick Thistle F.C. players
St Patrick's Athletic F.C. players
League of Ireland players
Clyde F.C. players
Ayr United F.C. players
Alloa Athletic F.C. players
Linlithgow Rose F.C. players
Kilbirnie Ladeside F.C. players
Scottish Junior Football Association players
Scottish Football League players
1981 births
Association football defenders
Expatriate association footballers in the Republic of Ireland
Association football midfielders